The siege of Malacca occurred in 1568, when the Sultan of Aceh Alauddin attacked the Portuguese-held city of Malacca. The city had been held by the Portuguese since its conquest by Afonso de Albuquerque in 1511.

The offensive was the result of a pan-Islamic alliance to try to repel the Portuguese from Malacca and the coasts of India. The Ottomans supplied cannonneers to the alliance, but were unable to provide more due to the ongoing invasion of Cyprus and an uprising in Aden.

The army of the Sultan was composed of a large fleet of long galley-type oared ships, 15,000 troops, and Ottoman mercenaries. The city of Malacca was successfully defended by Dom Leonis Pereira, who was supported by the king of Johore.

Other attacks on Malacca by the Acehnese would continue during the following years, especially in 1570. The offensive weakened the Portuguese Empire. In the 1570s, the Sultan of the Moluccas was able to repel the Portuguese from the Spice Islands.

Notes

Malacca
Malacca (1568)
Malacca (1568)
Malacca
History of Malacca
1568 in the Ottoman Empire
1568 in Portuguese Malacca